Rick Pasqualone (born 1965/1966) is an American stage, film, television and voice actor. He voiced Vito Scaletta, a character in the games Mafia II and Mafia III, Doctor Strange in Ultimate Marvel vs. Capcom 3 and Vinnie in The Darkness II.

Career
Pasqualone first started acting in 1990 when he was cast as Tony in the long-running Off-Broadway hit Tony N' Tina's Wedding. He later made his Broadway debut in the Neil Simon comedy Proposals. His first film role was in the 1996 short film, Tales of Erotica, which also starred a young Mira Sorvino. Michael Sorvino, Mira's brother, had voiced Tommy Angelo in the 2002 game Mafia: The City of Lost Heaven. In addition to television, Pasqualone also does voice-over work for commercials and video games. Some of his more notable works include Civilization V, Halo 5: Guardians, Batman: Arkham Knight, The Darkness II and Grand Theft Auto V. In 2009, he became the new voice of Aldo Trapani in The Godfather II. In 2010, he voiced Vito Scaletta, the main protagonist of Mafia II, and a character of its 2016 sequel, Mafia III. The voice of Vito is his most popular role to date. He was also the voice of Diego in the video game Ice Age: Dawn of the Dinosaurs and Dan Turpin in The Death of Superman.

Filmography

Film

Television

Video games

Web series

References

External links

Living people
American male film actors
American male television actors
American male video game actors
American male voice actors
American people of Italian descent
Place of birth missing (living people)
Year of birth missing (living people)
20th-century American actors
21st-century American actors